Soldier-Talk is the third studio album by the American experimental rock band Red Crayola. It was released in 1979 by the record label Radar. By this time, Thompson had moved the project to London and expanded the band for this album to include Lora Logic of X-Ray Spex and Essential Logic and all of the members of Pere Ubu.

Background 
Since the release of God Bless the Red Krayola and All Who Sail With It, Steve Cunningham had left the project to pursue his own musical ambitions and had been replaced by Jesse Chamberlain. In 1978, this incarnation of the band was touring regularly and had been signed to Radar Records. While in Europe, Thompson met Pere Ubu, who were touring in support of The Modern Dance, and struck up a friendship.

Composition 
Despite the presence of Pere Ubu, the music is a close continuation of the sound previously established by The Red Crayola. Soldier-Talk was conceived as a concept album dealing with militarism.

Chamberlain wanted to veer the music towards a more pop-oriented direction while Thompson opted to keep the sound experimental. As Thompson explained, "There wasn't much for him to do, in a way, I think he wanted to say what he felt about the record, and he wanted it closer in the direction of pop, because Jesse, that's always been one of his gifts, and I was determined to make the record work, and thought that it could, and should, and working with Geoff Travis, using his insights into the way music works, there was no other way it could be..." The conflict  caused a strain on their musical partnership, although they later worked again on another record in a similar vein, Three Songs on a Trip to the United States, the cover of which referenced Soldier-Talk.

Release 
Soldier-Talk was released in 1979. Around the release of the album, Mayo Thompson became an active producer for many of the bands on the Rough Trade roster, including Stiff Little Fingers, The Fall and The Raincoats. He also became a member of Pere Ubu, filling the spot left after Tom Herman's departure, and recorded the albums The Art of Walking and Song of the Bailing Man with the group.

Reception 

Thom Jurek of AllMusic declared it "among the loopiest of the Red Krayola's offerings", and representative of "post-punk's more musically adventurous side". He gave the album three out of five stars, describing the songs as being independently compelling and engaging. Mark Pytlik of Pitchfork gave the album 5.3 out of 10 and was critical towards the overall abrasiveness of the music, writing, "It's a consistently interesting album – there's something trying to get your attention at every moment, but in the manner of a beloved little sibling who won't stop poking you." He concluded that the record was best suited for those who find Gang of Four's Entertainment! too subdued.

Legacy 
The bass guitarist Mike Watt named Soldier-Talk one of his favorite rock albums.

Track listing

Personnel 

 The Red Crayola

 Jesse Chamberlain – drums
 Mayo Thompson – vocals, guitar, production
 Additional musicians
 Dick Cuthell – trumpet
 Tom Herman – guitar
 Scott Krauss - drums
 Lora Logic – saxophone
 Tony Maimone – bass guitar
 Allen Ravenstine – keyboards
 David Thomas – vocals

 Additional personnel

 Christine Thompson – additional vocals

 Technical

 Bob Broglia – engineering, mixing
 Alan Jakoby – engineering
 Stephen Lipson – engineering
 Geoff Travis – production

References

External links 
 

1979 albums
Drag City (record label) albums
Radar Records albums
Red Krayola albums
Albums produced by Mayo Thompson